Troyebratka is a rural locality (a station) in Novomikhaylovsky Selsoviet of Oktyabrsky District, Amur Oblast, Russia. The population was 24 as of 2018.

Geography 
Troyebratka is located 19 km southeast of Yekaterinoslavka (the district's administrative centre) by road. Novomikhaylovka is the nearest rural locality.

References 

Rural localities in Oktyabrsky District, Amur Oblast